Smicrus is a genus of beetles belonging to the family Ptiliidae.

The species of this genus are found in Europe and America.

Species:
 Smicrus americanus Casey, 1886 
 Smicrus aubaei (Matthews, 1872)

References

Ptiliidae